The National Strategy to Redress Environmental Racism Act (Bill C-230, 2020) is a proposed law before the Parliament of Canada. A private member's bill proposed by Cumberland—Colchester MP Lenore Zann, it has currently passed second reading in the House of Commons.

Summary 
If passed, the bill would requite the federal Minister of the Environment to create a national strategy to tackle environmental racism within two years. It includes provisions for the government to collect statistical information on the links between race, socioeconomic status, health outcomes, and environmental hazards.

Legislative history 
Zann had previously proposed a similar bill to the Nova Scotia House of Assembly in 2017, when she served as an MLA, however it did not pass. She had worked with Dalhousie University professor Ingrid Waldron on writing the bill.

Elected as a federal MP with the Liberal Party of Canada in 2019, Zann introduced a federal version of the act as a private member's bill to the House of Commons in February 2020. The bill was seconded by Green Party leader Elizabeth May. After the federal parliament was prorogued from August to September 2020, the bill was reinstated to the new session of parliament. On the 24th of March 2021, the bill passed its second reading in the House of Commons by a vote of 182 to 153, being referred to the Standing Committee on Environment and Sustainable Development before third reading.

References 

Canadian federal legislation
Environmentalism in Canada
Anti-racism in Canada
2020 in Canadian law